Antonie Grimaldi (c. 13?? – 1427) was Lord of Monaco from 1419 until 1427. He ruled jointly with his brothers Jean I and Ambroise.

Notes 

14th-century births
1427 deaths
15th-century Lords of Monaco
House of Grimaldi
Lords of Monaco